Chesias angeri is a moth of the family Geometridae. It is endemic to Italy.

References

angeri
Moths described in 1919
Endemic fauna of Italy